The Kanaga mask is a mask of the Dogon of Mali traditionally used by members of the Awa Society, especially during the ceremonies of the cult of the dead (dama, ceremony of mourning).

Symbolism 
The Kanaga mask evokes the Creator God Amma. It presents a double cross shape, which reminds the creation of the world, danced during funeral ceremonies where it is used by members of the Awa society. The general uninitiated public tends to see there various animal subjects : the kommolo tebu (a bird), the lizard, the iguana, the barâmkamza dullogu (a water insect), the hand of God or the female spirit of the trees (gyinu ya). The mask is represented both in male and female form. The male version is the most numerous.

Kanaga is represented on the flag of French Sudan (1892–1958) and the ephemeral Republic of Sudan (1958–1959). As well as that of the Federation of Mali (1959–1960) grouping Senegal and the Sudanese Republic.

Gallery

References

Bibliography 
Marcel Griaule et Germaine Dieterlen, Le renard pâle : 1 Le Mythe cosmogonique, fasc. 1 La création du monde, Institut d'Ethnologie, Paris, 1991 (rééd.), 
Nadine Martinez, Écritures africaines: esthétique et fonction des écritures Dogon, Bamana et Sénoufo, L'Harmattan, Paris, 2010, 272 p. 
Famedji-Koto Tchimou, Langage de la danse chez les Dogons, L'Harmattan, Paris, 1995, 174 p. 

Masks
African art
Masks in Africa